Woolworth Mexicana is a chain of retail Department stores which were founded by the F. W. Woolworth Company of the United States. It became independent in a management buyout by the Mexican executives in 1997. The company is now part of Grupo Comercial Control a holding company with operations in retailing.

References 
Bloomberg: 2015-07-16: Mexico where shoppers still flock to Blockbusters and Woolworth
El Financiero: 2015-12-15: The presence of Woolworth in Mexico is growing

External links 
Delsol Woolworth
Online Woolworths Museum
Grupo Comercial Control

Retail companies of Mexico
Retail companies established in 1997
F. W. Woolworth Company